Gracilentulus fjellbergi is a species of proturan in the family Acerentomidae. It is found in Europe and Northern Asia (excluding China) and Southern Asia.

References

Further reading

 

Protura
Articles created by Qbugbot
Animals described in 1993